This is a list of past and present programs broadcast by the Canadian television channel Sportsnet 360 as well as under its former name, The Score Television Network.

Current

A-E
Aftermath
Branded
European Poker Tour

F-J
The Final Score
Games of the Night
Gillette Drafted

K-O
MMA Fight Night
The MMA Show
Morning Highlights
NCAA Basketball Live
NCAA Football Bowl Games
NFL Blitz
NFL Sights and Sounds
OUA Basketball

P-T
Prime Time Sports
Tim & Sid

U-Z
University Rush
World Poker Tour
World Series of Poker Europe
The WWE Experience
WWE Main Event
WWE Raw
WWE SmackDown
WWE Vintage Collection

Past

#
24 in 30

A-E
Asia Pacific Poker Tour
Aussie Millions
Bellator Fighting Championships
The Basketball Jones
Bet Night Live
Blue Mountain State
Cabbie on the Street
Cabbie Unlimited
Canada Cup of Poker
Court Cuts
Covers Experts
Drive This!
Eastbound & Down

F-J
Facts of Fishing
The Footy Show
Full Tilt: Million Dollar Cash Game
Gerry Dee: Sports Reporter
Gotta Grudge?
Hardcore Championship Fighting
Hardcore Hockey Talk
Hardcore Hockey Talk: Late Edition
Hockey Saturday

K-O
National Heads-Up Poker Championship
NBA Basketball Live
NBA Court Surfing
NFL Previews
NHL Preview
NHL Trade Deadline

P-T
The Score Fighting Series
Score in the Morning
Score Now
Score on the NFL
Score Rewind
Score Today
Score Tonight
Serie A Rewind
Sports World Match Day
Sportsworld
Stat Attack
Tim and Sid: Uncut

U-Z
WEC Wreckage
Woodbine Racing Live
WWE NXT

See also
Sportsnet 360

External links
theScore website

Lists of television series by network